a Japanese voice actress from Osaka, Japan. She is often typecast as Genki girls or tomboyish characters due to her Kansai dialect. Using the alias "AYA", Kaoru has also done voice acting for Anime Eroge titles but also provided theme song vocals for both  Evangelion and Le Chevalier D'Eon.

Voice roles

TV animation
Ike! Inachû takkyû-bu – Female Student, Female Staff (1995)
You're Under Arrest THE MOVIE – Ayane Hayashi (1999)
Gensomaden Saiyuki – Lirin, Hakuryu, Additional Voices (2000)
Inuyasha – Vixen (2000)
Samurai Girl: Real Bout High School – Nanase Kuon (2001)
Comic Party – Yuu Inagawa (2001)
Usagi-chan de Cue!! – Mikami Inaba/Mimika (2001–2002)
Shrine of the Morning Mist – Seiko Rikiishi (2002)
Tokyo Underground – Chelsea Rorec (2002)
Jungle wa itsumo Hale nochi Guu Deluxe – Weda (2002)
Jungle wa Itsumo Hale Nochi Guu Final – Weda (2003)
Kaleido Star – Lady (2003)
True Love Story: Summer Days, and yet... – Ruri Morisaki (2003)
Raimuiro Senkitan – Rasha (2003)
Tantei Gakuen Q – Kaori-san (2003–2004)
Raimuiro Senkitan: The South Island Dream Romantic Adventure – Rasha (2004)
Medaka no Gakkō – Medaka Kōno (2004–2005)
Comic Party: Revolution – Yuu Inagawa (2005)
Magical Canan – Shiba Koube (2005)
Kishin Houkou Demonbane – Chiaki (2006)
Bleach – Mizuho Asano (2007)
Koihime Musō – Choryo (2008)
Shin Koihime Musō – Choryo (2010)
Saki Achiga-hen episode of side-A – Toshi Kumakura (2012)
Toriko – Tsurara Mama (2012)
Monogatari Series Second Season – Mrs. Hachikuji (2013)
Saki: The Nationals – Toshi Kumakura, Kumiko Hanibuchi (2014)

Games
Super Monkey Ball – Monkey Voice #1 (2001)
Super Monkey Ball 2 – Monkey Voice #1 (2002)
Sonic Riders – AiAi (2006)
Sega Superstars Tennis – AiAi (2008)
Sonic & Sega All-Stars Racing – AiAi (2010)

Dubbing
Inferno – Carol Delvecchio
Picking Up the Pieces – Carlita
Everybody Loves Sunshine – Nelson
The Golden Bowl – Maggie Verver
The Sweetest Thing – Judy Webb
But I'm a Cheerleader – Graham
Purely Belter – Gemma
Jackie Brown – Sheronda
Remember the Titans – Emma Hoyt
Love in Paris – Claire
The Legend of Bagger Vance – Mary Jones
He Got Game – Lala Bonilla (Rosario Dawson)

References

External links
 
 

1971 births
Japanese voice actresses
Living people
Voice actresses from Osaka Prefecture